Anthony J. Ribustello was an American actor and Republican politician. He was best known for his role as Dante Greco, Tony Soprano's driver on the HBO series The Sopranos.

In April 2009, Ribustello ran for Bronx Borough President as the Republican candidate in a special election to replace incumbent Democrat Adolfo Carrion, who resigned to take a position in the Obama Administration. Ribustello received about 13 percent of the vote in the overwhelmingly Democratic borough, losing to Democratic Assemblyman Ruben Diaz Jr.

In addition to acting, Ribustello was also employed at the New York City Board of Elections. He died on December 28, 2019, after years of waiting for a kidney transplant.

References

External links

New York Times, April 17, 2009, "Tony Soprano's Driver Eyes a Different Gig"
Norwood News (Bronx), April 2, 2009, "Actor Takes on Role of Underdog in B.P. Race"
Our Campaigns: Anthony Ribustello

2019 deaths
Male actors from New York (state)
American male film actors
Place of birth missing
Place of death missing
American male television actors
New York (state) Republicans
People from the Bronx
Year of birth missing